Laelaspoides is a genus of mites in the family Laelapidae.

Species
 Laelapsoides dentatus (Halbert, 1920)
 Laelaspoides ordwayae Eickwort, 1966 — found in the underground nests of halictid bees, genus Augochlorella.

References

Laelapidae